Boonkerd Chaiyasin (born January 9, 1996), simply known as Tep, is a Thai professional footballer who plays as a striker for Thai League 3 club Lamphun Warrior.

External links
 

1996 births
Living people
Boonkerd Chaiyasin
Boonkerd Chaiyasin
Association football forwards
Boonkerd Chaiyasin
Boonkerd Chaiyasin
Boonkerd Chaiyasin
Boonkerd Chaiyasin
Boonkerd Chaiyasin
Boonkerd Chaiyasin